John Joseph Broaca (October 3, 1909 – May 16, 1985) was an American professional baseball pitcher from 1934 to 1939. Broaca won at least 12 games for the New York Yankees his first three seasons. However, in 1937, Broaca took a leave of absence for no apparent reason and only pitched in 7 games. He did not pitch at all in 1938, and in 1939 he played briefly with the Cleveland Indians. His lifetime record as a pitcher for the New York Yankees and Cleveland Indians was 44–29.

Biography
Johnny was born in Lawrence, Massachusetts and was of Lithuanian descent. He attended Lawrence High School, but transferred to and graduated from Phillips Academy Andover after two years. He continued his education at Yale University. While at Yale, he was a tri-sport athlete, competing in baseball, boxing, and track. While a student at Yale, Broaca spent the summers of 1930 to 1932 playing for the Orleans town team in the Cape Cod Baseball League.

In his rookie season with the New York Yankees in 1934, Broaca went 12–9 as a starter with an earned run average of 4.16. In 1935, he had his most successful statistical season, where he went 15–7 with an ERA of 3.58.  In 1936, the year the Yankees won the World Series, Broaca was 12–7 with an ERA of 4.24.

In 1937, after starting the season with a disappointing 1–4 record, Broaca abruptly left the team with his wife eight months pregnant—becoming the first player to jump the team in at least a quarter-century. He was only heard from again in September, when his wife filed for divorce on grounds of severe abuse at his hands; she claimed he went into fits of rage and started beating her a month into their marriage.  The Yankees were so outraged by what emerged in the trial that they voted Broaca's wife a $1,000 World Series share.  His hiatus from baseball extended into the entire 1938 season.

Broaca had a brief stint as a professional boxer, but failed to win a single bout.  The Yankees were willing to bring him back in 1938, but refused to cover his medical expenses, as he was demanding.  In 1939, the Yankees traded his rights to the Cleveland Indians. He was used primarily as a reliever, and he appeared in 22 games with a 4–2 record.  However, by this time it was apparent his arm was giving out; he'd had arm trouble since at least his collegiate days.  After the season, he was traded to the New York Giants.  However, by this time it was obvious he was finished.  The Giants traded him back to the Indians in June, and the Indians promptly released him.

After working on the home front in World War II, Broaca spent most of the rest of his life as a common laborer on road construction crews.  His coworkers learned early on never to ask him about baseball.  He died in 1985, having not spoken to his son in almost half a century even though he lived only 25 miles away.

References

External links

Johnny Broaca Biography from Society for American Baseball Research (SABR)

1909 births
1985 deaths
American people of Lithuanian descent
Sportspeople from Lawrence, Massachusetts
Phillips Academy alumni
Yale University alumni
Baseball players from Massachusetts
Major League Baseball pitchers
New York Yankees players
Cleveland Indians players
Orleans Firebirds players
Cape Cod Baseball League players (pre-modern era)
Lawrence High School (Massachusetts) alumni